is a former Japanese football player. He played for Japan national team.

Club career
Takamatsu was born in Ube on September 8, 1981. After graduating from high school, he joined J2 League side Oita Trinita in 2000. He played 6 games and scored 1 goal in his first season. In 2001, he became a regular playing 22 league games and scored 8 goals. The club won the champions in 2002 and was promoted to J1 League. He became a center player of the team with the growing number of young players, Shusaku Nishikawa, Masato Morishige, Mu Kanazaki, Hiroshi Kiyotake and also served captain from 2008. In 2008, although he did not play many matches for injury, the club won J.League Cup their first major title. At the J.League Cup Final, he scored a winning goal and he was elected MVP award. However the club was relegated to J2 League end of 2009 season. Although many main players left the club for financial strain, he remained the club. He moved to FC Tokyo on loan in 2011. He returned to Oita Trinita in 2012. He played many matches as substitutes and the club was promoted to J1 League in 2013. However the club was relegated to J2 League in 2014 and J3 League in 2016. In 2016, the club won the champions and was promoted to J2 League. However he could hardly play in the match and retired end of 2016 season.

National team career
In August 2004, Takamatsu was selected Japan U-23 national team for 2004 Summer Olympics. He played all 3 matches and scored a goal against Italy.

The 2006 season turned out to be the most prolific season for him scoring 12 league goals. The reward was the first Japan national team cap handed by national coach Ivica Osim on November 15, 2006 in an 2007 Asian Cup qualification against Saudi Arabia at Sapporo Dome when he replaced Kazuki Ganaha in the 74th minute. He played 2 games for Japan until 2007.

Club statistics

National team statistics

Personal honors
 J.League Cup MVP - 2008

Achievements
 Nominated for FIFA World Player of the Year: 2003

References

External links

Japan National Football Team Database

1981 births
Living people
Association football people from Yamaguchi Prefecture
Japanese footballers
Japan international footballers
J1 League players
J2 League players
J3 League players
Oita Trinita players
FC Tokyo players
Olympic footballers of Japan
Footballers at the 2004 Summer Olympics
Association football forwards
Japanese sportsperson-politicians